Lukas Wambua Muteti (born in Muumoni, Machakos County, Kenya) is a Kenyan long-distance runner and the founder of MiraRunners, a non-profit organization that assists Kenyan runners in Asia. He has won various prestigious international marathons, including the Bangkok Marathon and Kaohsiung International Marathon.

References

External links 
Lukas Muteti official page
ARRS profile

Living people
Kenyan male long-distance runners
Year of birth missing (living people)
People from Machakos County